The 2011 Montepaschi Strade Bianche took place on 5 March 2011. It was the 5th edition of the international classic Montepaschi Strade Bianche.

Results

Strade Bianche
Montepaschi
Montepaschi Strade Bianche